Lake Nocona or Farmer's Creek Reservoir was begun in 1959 and completed in October 1960. It is formed by a dam on Farmer's Creek about nine miles northeast of Nocona, Texas in northeastern Montague County and is owned and operated by North Montague County Water Supply District. The lake was constructed for municipal, industrial, and mining purposes.

Fishing
The lake is well stocked with largemouth bass - record  (1997), crappie - record  (1999), blue and channel catfish - record  (1995), and hybrid striped bass - record  (2005). Lake Nocona is classified as the fourth-best bass fishing lake in Texas. There is standing timber uplake and in Farmers Creek. These features furnish excellent cover for fish. Rip-rap along the dam provides excellent habitat for bass and sunfishes. In early spring and winter, big bass can be caught deep on rocky ledges off the face of the dam.

Other Recreational Activities
Lake Nocona offers many recreational opportunities. Facilities include a marina, lakeside RV spaces and camping grounds, and three public parks with boat ramps and fishing piers. The three public parks are Weldon Robb, Joe Benton, and Boone.  All are free public access and open year-round.  Additionally, the city of Nocona has  a  July 4 fireworks show at Weldon Robb Park.

Local towns and other areas of interest
Nocona, Texas;  Capps Corner, Texas;  Illinois Bend, Texas;  Spanish Fort, Texas;   Nocona Hills Country Club and Residential Community;

References

External links
 Lake Nocona - Texas Parks & Wildlife
  Lake Nocona Yacht Club

Protected areas of Montague County, Texas
Nocona
Bodies of water of Montague County, Texas